Twister is a compilation album by Washington, D.C. Indie band Unrest, released on September 9, 1988, by TeenBeat Records.

Track listing

Personnel
Adapted from the Twister liner notes.

Unrest
 Phil Krauth – instruments
 Tim Moran – instruments
 Dave Park – instruments
 Mark Robinson – instruments, design
 Chris Thomson – instruments

Production and additional personnel
 Unrest – recording

Release history

References

External links 
 

1988 compilation albums
Unrest (band) albums
TeenBeat Records albums